Robert Laughlin Simpson, A.C.E. (July 31, 1910 – June 26, 1977), was an American film editor with more than 100 feature film credits.

Biography
Born in St. Louis, Missouri, Simpson began his career at Paramount Pictures in 1935. By the end of the decade, he had joined 20th Century Fox, where he remained for more than 35 years.

During a 55-year career, Simpson edited one hundred films, including Drums Along the Mohawk (1939), The Grapes of Wrath (1940), The Pride of St. Louis (1952), Call Me Madam, The King and I (1956), South Pacific (1958), Fate is the Hunter (1964), and Tony Rome (1967). He collaborated with director George Seaton on several projects, including Miracle on 34th Street, The Shocking Miss Pilgrim, Apartment for Peggy, and Chicken Every Sunday. He also worked with John Ford, Sidney Lanfield, and Walter Lang.

Simpson was nominated for the Academy Award for Best Film Editing for The Grapes of Wrath.

Partial filmography

Her Master's Voice (1936)   
Love and Hisses (1937)
Josette (1938)
Drums Along the Mohawk (1939)
Public Deb No. 1 (1940)
The Grapes of Wrath (1940)
Sweet Rosie O'Grady (1943)
Miracle on 34th Street (1947)
The Shocking Miss Pilgrim (1947)
Apartment for Peggy (1948)
Chicken Every Sunday (1949)
The Big Lift (1950)
The Pride of St. Louis (1952)
Call Me Madam
The King and I (1956)
South Pacific (1958)
Move Over, Darling (1963)
Fate is the Hunter (1964)
Tony Rome (1967)

See also
 List of film director and editor collaborations. From 1940 to 1960, Simpson edited ten films directed by Walter Lang; The King and I (1956) was nominated for both the Academy Award for Best Picture and the Academy Award for Best Director.

References

External links

1910 births
1977 deaths
American film editors
American Cinema Editors
Artists from St. Louis